A yoke is a device borne across the shoulders of animals or humans, for example to harness draught animals together, or to assist humans (see carrying pole) in transporting heavy or awkward burdens.

Yoke may also refer to:

 Yoke (aeronautics), the "wheel" that controls the ailerons and elevator on aircraft
 Yoke (unit of measurement) used in the time of the Domesday Book for tax purposes in Kent
 Yoke (clothing), part of the construction of a garment
 Yoke (Lake District), a high point in Cumbria, England
 Yoke Island, Palmer Archipelago, Antarctica
 Yoke language, spoken by about 200 people in Papua, Indonesia
 Magnetic yoke, structure, typically of iron, designed to provide a low permeability path for the magnetic field lines from the back of one pole to the back of the other.
 Deflection yoke, a device to divert the electron beam in a cathode ray tube
 Scotch yoke, a mechanism converting rotary motion to reciprocating motion or vice versa
 Six pack yoke, a plastic holder for beverage cans
 "Yoke", a song by Basement from their 2011 album I Wish I Could Stay Here
 Yoke, part of a motorcycle fork
 A nickname given by hobbyist for Yokomo
 A connector used in a stage lighting instrument
 Ring yoke, the frame to which magnets are attached in a field coil
 SCUBA diving yoke, an A-clamp connector
 A nuclear test in Operation Sandstone
 A slang term for the drug MDMA, better known as "ecstasy"
 A mounting strap used to secure a wiring device to an electrical box.
 Irish, slang for any device, unusual object, or gadget: "Where's the yoke for opening boxes?"

See also
 Yokes (disambiguation)
 Yolk, the nutrient-bearing portion of an egg